The communauté de communes du Pays de Tronçais is a communauté de communes, located in the Allier department of the Auvergne-Rhône-Alpes region of France.

Communal territory

Composition 
The communauté de communes is composed of the 15 following communes:

Demographics

Organization

List of presidents

See also 

 List of intercommunalities of the Allier department

References 

Pays_de_Tronçais
Pays_de_Tronçais
Cérilly, Allier